Tristan Myles is a British-Canadian visual effects artist. He won two Academy Awards in the category Best Visual Effects for the films First Man and Dune.

Selected filmography 
 First Man (2018; co-won with Paul Lambert, Ian Hunter and J. D. Schwalm)
 Dune (2021; co-won with Paul Lambert, Brian Connor and Gerd Nefzer)

References

External links 

Living people
Place of birth missing (living people)
Year of birth missing (living people)
Visual effects artists
Visual effects supervisors
Best Visual Effects Academy Award winners